Sergio Rubio Ríos (born 27 November 1956) is a Mexican football manager and former defender.

Playing career
Sergio Rubio made his debut on July 31, 1977 with Cruz Azul in a match against Unión de Curtidores, where Cruz Azul fell 2-1. With Cruz Azul he was a two time champion in the  1978-1979 and 1979-1980 seasons.

Management career
Rubio has spent his coaching career in the Liga de Ascenso. He has coached defunct Club de Fútbol Cuernavaca, Cruz Azul Oaxaca who are now Cruz Azul Hidalgo, Atlético Celaya who are now Club Celaya, and currently is the manager at Estudiantes de Altamira.

References

External links

1956 births
Living people
Mexican footballers
C.D. Guadalajara footballers
Cruz Azul footballers
Mexican football managers
Association football defenders